The 1985–86 Scottish League Cup was the fortieth season of Scotland's second football knockout competition. The competition was won by Aberdeen, who defeated Hibernian in the Final.

First round

Second round

Third round

Quarter-finals

Semi-finals

First Leg

Second Leg

Final

References

General

Specific

1985–86 in Scottish football
Scottish League Cup seasons